Mahomets Flats is an inner southern coastal suburb of Geraldton, Western Australia in the local government area of the City of Greater Geraldton.

The suburb was gazetted in 1972.

Geography
It is bounded on the southwest by the Indian Ocean, on the north by the freight railway, on the east by Keane Drive and Brand Highway, and on the south by Olive Street.

Demographics

Mahomets Flats residents had a median age of 33 — below the regional average of 35 — and median incomes were average for the region — $541 per week compared with $461 per week. The population of Mahomets Flats was predominantly Australian-born — 80.4% as at the 2006 census — while 3.36% were born in the United Kingdom. 6.91% reported one or more parents of Italian birth.

References

Suburbs of Geraldton